Coventry Hall, also known as Oakleigh, is a historic home located in South Coventry Township, Chester County, Pennsylvania.  It was built in three major phases.  The oldest section was built between 1740 and 1760. It is a -story, fieldstone structure with a gable roof and cut stone on the front facade.  Two additions were made on the east end; the first about 1798 and the second in 1803.

The house was added to the National Register of Historic Places in 1974.

References

Houses on the National Register of Historic Places in Pennsylvania
Houses completed in 1803
Houses in Chester County, Pennsylvania
National Register of Historic Places in Chester County, Pennsylvania